Jörg Schramme (born 25 December 1951) is a German sailor. He competed for East Germany at the 1976 Summer Olympics and the 1980 Summer Olympics.

References

External links
 

1951 births
Living people
Swiss male sailors (sport)
Olympic sailors of East Germany
Sailors at the 1976 Summer Olympics – Flying Dutchman
Sailors at the 1980 Summer Olympics – Tornado
Sportspeople from Leipzig